Pehlivanköy station is a station in Pehlivanköy, Turkey. The station is located just before the Edirne cut-off splits off the Istanbul-Pythio railway. TCDD Taşımacılık operates a daily regional train from Istanbul to Kapıkule, which stops at Pehlivanköy.

The station was opened on 4 April 1873, by the Oriental Railway.

Between July 2005 and February 2011 the Friendship Express, (an international InterCity train jointly operated by the Turkish State Railways (TCDD) and TrainOSE linking Istanbul's Sirkeci Terminal, Turkey and Thessaloniki, Greece) made scheduled stops at Pehlivanköy.

References

External links
Station timetable

Railway stations in Kırklareli Province
Railway stations opened in 1873
1873 establishments in the Ottoman Empire
Pehlivanköy District